The Sea Wall is a 2008 film by Cambodian director Rithy Panh in a French/Cambodian/Belgian co-production. The film opened on 7 January 2009 in France. It was adapted from the 1950 novel The Sea Wall by Marguerite Duras. The novel had previously been adapted as This Angry Age by René Clément in 1958.

Cast
 Isabelle Huppert as Mother
 Gaspard Ulliel as Joseph
 Àstrid Bergès-Frisbey as Suzanne
 Stéphane Rideau as Agosti
 Randal Douc as Monsieur Jo
 Duong Vanthon as Corporal
 Lucy Harrison as Carmen
 Vincent Grass as Father Bart

See also
 Isabelle Huppert on screen and stage

References

External links
 
 
 Un Barrage Contre Le Pacifique (2008)
 Find Articles at BNET

Cambodian drama films
2008 drama films
2008 films
Belgian drama films
French drama films
Films directed by Rithy Panh
Films based on works by Marguerite Duras
Films based on French novels
Films set in 1931
Films set in French Indochina
2000s French-language films
French-language Belgian films
2000s French films